The 2013–14 Denver Nuggets season was the 47th season of the franchise, and its 38th season in the National Basketball Association (NBA). The Nuggets struggled for much of the year, finishing with a 36–46 record, missing the playoffs for the first time in 11 years.

Key dates
 May 31: GM Masai Ujiri accepts position with Toronto Raptors.
 June 6: Head coach George Karl is relieved of coaching duties.
 June 17: Tim Connelly named executive VP of basketball operations.
 June 25: Brian Shaw named head coach.
 June 27: The 2013 NBA draft took place at Barclays Center in Brooklyn, New York.

Draft

  Acquired from the Utah Jazz.
  Acquired from the Memphis Grizzlies.

Roster

Pre-season

|- style="background:#cfc;"
| 1
| October 6
| @ L.A. Lakers
| 
| Lawson & Hamilton (15)
| Ty Lawson (10)
| Ty Lawson (6)
| Staples Center16,722
| 1–0
|- style="background:#fcc;"
| 2
| October 8
| @ L.A. Lakers
| 
| JaVale McGee (14)
| Faried & Hickson (10)
| Lawson & Fournier (5)
| Citizens Business Bank Arena6,023
| 1–1
|- style="background:#cfc;"
| 3
| October 14
| San Antonio
| 
| Kenneth Faried (22)
| Kenneth Faried (9)
| Ty Lawson (8)
| Pepsi Center14,671
| 2–1
|- style="background:#fcc;"
| 4
| October 15
| @ Oklahoma City
| 
| Robinson & Miller (10)
| JaVale McGee (8)
| Ty Lawson (4)
| Chesapeake Energy Arena18,203
| 2–2
|- style="background:#fcc;"
| 5
| October 19
| @ L.A. Clippers
| 
| Randolph & Fournier (16)
| Evan Fournier (7)
| Quincy Miller (7)
| Mandalay Bay Events Center9,535
| 2–3
|- style="background:#fcc;"
| 6
| October 23
| Phoenix
| 
| Anthony Randolph (15)
| J. J. Hickson (7)
| Ty Lawson (8)
| Pepsi Center14,652
| 2–4
|- style="background:#fcc;"
| 7
| October 25
| @ Chicago
| 
| Randolph & McGee (15)
| JaVale McGee (8)
| Nate Robinson (5)
| United Center21,773
| 2–5

Regular season

Standings

Game log

|- style="background:#fcc;"
| 1
| October 30
| @ Sacramento
| 
| Ty Lawson (20)
| J. J. Hickson (9)
| Ty Lawson (8)
| Sleep Train Arena17,317
| 0–1

|- style="background:#fcc;"
| 2
| November 1
| Portland
| 
| Nate Robinson (24)
| Kenneth Faried (11)
| Ty Lawson (6)
| Pepsi Center19,155
| 0–2
|- style="background:#fcc;"
| 3
| November 5
| San Antonio
| 
| Ty Lawson (20)
| Kenneth Faried (8)
| Ty Lawson (8)
| Pepsi Center15,721
| 0–3
|- style="background:#cfc;"
| 4
| November 7
| Atlanta
| 
| Ty Lawson (23)
| Kenneth Faried (9)
| Ty Lawson (8)
| Pepsi Center15,404
| 1–3
|- style="background:#fcc;"
| 5
| November 8
| @ Phoenix
| 
| Ty Lawson (29)
| Jordan Hamilton (9)
| Foye, Lawson, Miller (4)
| US Airways Center15,145
| 1–4
|- style="background:#cfc;"
| 6
| November 11
| @ Utah
| 
| Ty Lawson (17)
| Kenneth Faried (13)
| Ty Lawson (10)
| EnergySolutions Arena16,866
| 2–4
|- style="background:#cfc;"
| 7
| November 13
| L.A. Lakers
| 
| Timofey Mozgov (23)
| Kenneth Faried (13)
| Ty Lawson (7)
| Pepsi Center17,824
| 3–4
|- style="background:#cfc;"
| 8
| November 15
| Minnesota
| 
| Wilson Chandler (19)
| J. J. Hickson (11)
| Ty Lawson (10)
| Pepsi Center17,142
| 4–4
|- style="background:#fcc;"
| 9
| November 16
| @ Houston
| 
| Ty Lawson (28)
| Faried & Mozgov (10)
| Ty Lawson (17)
| Toyota Center18,147
| 4–5
|- style="background:#fcc;"
| 10
| November 18
| @ Oklahoma City
| 
| Ty Lawson (29)
| J. J. Hickson (19)
| Ty Lawson (8)
| Chesapeake Energy Arena18,203
| 4–6
|- style="background:#cfc;"
| 11
| November 21
| Chicago
| 
| Jordan Hamilton (17)
| Kenneth Faried (11)
| Ty Lawson (7)
| Pepsi Center18,423
| 5–6
|- style="background:#cfc;"
| 12
| November 23
| Dallas
| 
| Ty Lawson (20)
| Kenneth Faried (14)
| Ty Lawson (9)
| Pepsi Center17,841
| 6–6
|- style="background:#cfc;"
| 13
| November 25
| @ Dallas
|  
| J. J. Hickson (22)
| Kenneth Faried (10)
| Ty Lawson (11)
| American Airlines Center19,677
| 7–6
|- style="background:#cfc;"
| 14
| November 27
| @ Minnesota
| 
| Ty Lawson (23)
| Timofey Mozgov (8)
| Andre Miller (6)
| Target Center14,244
| 8–6
|- style="background:#cfc;"
| 15
| November 29
| New York
| 
| Ty Lawson (22)
| J. J. Hickson (11)
| Ty Lawson (8)
| Pepsi Center19,155
| 9–6

|- style="background:#cfc;"
| 16
| December 1
| @ Toronto
| 
| Nate Robinson (23)
| Timofey Mozgov (15)
| Andre Miller (7)
| Air Canada Centre16,290
| 10–6
|- style="background:#cfc;"
| 17
| December 3
| @ Brooklyn
| 
| Timofey Mozgov (17)
| Timofey Mozgov (20)
| Andre Miller (7)
| Barclays Center17,732
| 11–6
|- style="background:#fcc;"
| 18
| December 4
| @ Cleveland
| 
| Randy Foye (16)
| J. J. Hickson (11)
| Ty Lawson (11)
| Quicken Loans Arena14,642
| 11–7
|- style="background:#fcc;"
| 19
| December 6
| @ Boston
| 
| Ty Lawson (20)
| Wilson Chandler (8)
| Ty Lawson (4)
| TD Garden17,263
| 11–8
|- style="background:#cfc;"
| 20
| December 7
| @ Philadelphia
| 
| Nate Robinson (20)
| J. J. Hickson (10)
| Andre Miller (7)
| Wells Fargo Center13,113
| 12–8
|- style="background:#cfc;"
| 21
| December 9
| @ Washington
| 
| Wilson Chandler (17)
| Wilson Chandler (8)
| Randy Foye (5)
| Verizon Center13,293
| 13–8
|- style="background:#fcc;"
| 22
| December 13
| Utah
| 
| Wilson Chandler (17)
| Kenneth Faried (9)
| Andre Miller (7)
| Pepsi Center15,616
| 13–9
|- style="background:#cfc;"
| 23
| December 15
| New Orleans
| 
| Wilson Chandler (19)
| J. J. Hickson (11)
| Ty Lawson (8)
| Pepsi Center15,111
| 14–9
|- style="background:#fcc;"
| 24
| December 17
| Oklahoma City
| 
| J. J. Hickson (20)
| J. J. Hickson (14)
| Ty Lawson (13)
| Pepsi Center17,035
| 14–10
|- style="background:#fcc;"
| 25
| December 20
| Phoenix
| 
| Wilson Chandler (15)
| J. J. Hickson (14)
| Ty Lawson (7)
| Pepsi Center15,974
| 14–11
|- style="background:#fcc;"
| 26
| December 21
| @ L.A. Clippers
| 
| Wilson Chandler (19)
| J. J. Hickson (9)
| Ty Lawson (6)
| Staples Center19,129
| 14–12
|- style="background:#fcc;"
| 27
| December 23
| Golden State
| 
| Ty Lawson (16)
| Timofey Mozgov (11)
| Andre Miller (8)
| Pepsi Center18,551
| 14–13
|- style="background:#fcc;"
| 28
| December 27
| @ New Orleans
| 
| Wilson Chandler (22)
| J.J. Hickson (10)
| Ty Lawson (12)
| New Orleans Arena18,089
| 14–14
|- style="background:#fcc;"
| 29
| December 28
| @ Memphis
| 
| Ty Lawson (20)
| J.J. Hickson (6)
| Ty Lawson (8)
| FedExForum17,017
| 14–15
|- style="background:#fcc;"
| 30
| December 30
| Miami
| 
| Ty Lawson (26)
| J.J. Hickson (11)
| Ty Lawson, Randy Foye (7)
| Pepsi Center19,155
| 14–16

|- style="background:#fcc;"
| 31
| January 1
| Philadelphia
| 
| J.J. Hickson (19)
| J.J. Hickson (11)
| Ty Lawson (11)
| Pepsi Center16,006
| 14–17
|- style="background:#cfc;"
| 32
| January 3
| Memphis
| 
| Ty Lawson (18)
| Randy Foye, Timofey Mozgov (7)
| Ty Lawson (12)
| Pepsi Center17,608
| 15–17
|- style="background:#cfc;"
| 33
| January 5
| @ L.A. Lakers
| 
| Nate Robinson (21)
| Kenneth Faried (13)
| Ty Lawson (12)
| Staples Center18,997
| 16–17
|- style="background:#cfc;"
| 34
| January 7
| Boston
| 
| Randy Foye (23)
| Kenneth Faried (13)
| Ty Lawson (13)
| Pepsi Center16,224
| 17–17
|- style="background:#cfc;"
| 35
| January 9
| Oklahoma City
| 
| Randy Foye (24)
| Kenneth Faried (14)
| Ty Lawson (14)
| Pepsi Center17,315
| 18–17
|- style="background:#cfc;"
| 36
| January 11
| Orlando
| 
| Randy Foye & Evan Fournier (18)
| Quincy Miller (11)
| Ty Lawson (8)
| Pepsi Center17,947
| 19–17
|- style="background:#fcc;"
| 37
| January 13
| @ Utah
| 
| Ty Lawson (23)
| J.J. Hickson (10)
| Ty Lawson (11)
| EnergySolutions Arena17,232
| 19–18
|- style="background:#cfc;"
| 38
| January 15
| @ Golden State
| 
| Nate Robinson (24)
| J.J. Hickson (24)
| Ty Lawson (11)
| Oracle Arena19,596
| 20–18
|- style="background:#fcc;"
| 39
| January 17
| Cleveland
| 
| Wilson Chandler (23)
| Timofey Mozgov (11)
| Ty Lawson (11)
| Pepsi Center18,486
| 20–19
|- style="background:#fcc;"
| 40
| January 19
| @ Phoenix
| 
| Anthony Randolph (19)
| J.J. Hickson (13)
| Ty Lawson (14)
| US Airways Center16,211
| 20–20
|- style="background:#fcc;"
| 41
| January 23
| @ Portland
| 
| Wilson Chandler (18)
| J.J. Hickson (7)
| Ty Lawson (11)
| Moda Center 20,066
| 20–21
|- style="background:#cfc;"
| 42
| January 25
| Indiana
| 
| Wilson Chandler (25)
| J.J. Hickson (13)
| Ty Lawson (10)
| Pepsi Center19,155
| 21–21
|- style="background:#cfc;"
| 43
| January 26
| @ Sacramento
| 
| Ty Lawson (27)
| Kenneth Faried (11)
| Nate Robinson (8)
| Sleep Train Arena15,939
| 22–21
|- style="background:#fcc;"
| 44
| January 29
| Charlotte
| 
| Randy Foye (33)
| Timofey Mozgov (14)
| Randy Foye (7)
| Pepsi Center16,151
| 22–22
|- style="background:#fcc;"
| 45
| January 31
| Toronto
| 
| J.J. Hickson (18)
| J.J. Hickson (13)
| Randy Foye (16)
| Pepsi Center17,131
| 22–23

|- style="background:#cfc;"
| 46
| February 3
| L.A. Clippers
| 
| Kenneth Faried (28)
| J.J. Hickson (12)
| J.J. Hickson (5)
| Pepsi Center16,567
| 23–23
|- style="background:#cfc;"
| 47
| February 5
| Milwaukee
| 
| Wilson Chandler (24)
| J.J. Hickson (10)
| Ty Lawson (13)
| Pepsi Center15,122
| 24–23
|- style="background:#fcc;"
| 48
| February 7
| @ New York
| 
| Ty Lawson (24)
| Wilson Chandler (7)
| Ty Lawson (7)
| Madison Square Garden19,812
| 24–24
|- style="background:#fcc;"
| 49
| February 8
| @ Detroit
| 
| Randy Foye (25)
| J.J. Hickson (16)
| Ty Lawson (7)
| Palace of Auburn Hills15,870
| 24–25
|- style="background:#fcc;"
| 50
| February 10
| @ Indiana
| 
| Wilson Chandler (17)
| J.J. Hickson (8)
| Randy Foye (10)
| Bankers Life Fieldhouse16,124
| 24–26
|- style="background:#fcc;"
| 51
| February 12
| @ Minnesota
| 
| Jordan Hamilton (16)
| J.J. Hickson (13)
| Jordan Hamilton (7)
| Target Center12,139
| 24–27
|- align="center"
|colspan="9" bgcolor="#bbcaff"|All-Star Break
|- style="background:#fcc;"
| 52
| February 18
| Phoenix
| 
| Evan Fournier (25)
| Timofey Mozgov (11)
| Randy Foye (5)
| Pepsi Center16,461
| 24–28
|- style="background:#cfc;"
| 53
| February 20
| @ Milwaukee
| 
| Kenneth Faried (26)
| J.J. Hickson (10)
| Randy Foye (10)
| BMO Harris Bradley Center11,186
| 25–28
|- style="background:#fcc;"
| 54
| February 21
| @ Chicago
| 
| Randy Foye (23)
| Timofey Mozgov (9)
| Randolph & Foye (3)
| United Center21,621
| 25–29
|- style="background:#fcc;"
| 55
| February 23
| Sacramento
| 
| Foye & Fournier (27)
| Hickson, Faried & Foye (6)
| Aaron Brooks (8)
| Pepsi Center16,263
| 25–30
|- style="background:#fcc;"
| 56
| February 25
| Portland
| 
| Randy Foye (17)
| J.J. Hickson (25)
| Aaron Brooks (6)
| Pepsi Center16,058
| 25–31
|- style="background:#fcc;"
| 57
| February 27
| Brooklyn
| 
| Randy Foye (14)
| Faried & Mozgov (8)
| Evan Fournier (5)
| Pepsi Center14,826
| 25–32

|- style="background:#fcc;"
| 58
| March 1
| @ Portland
| 
| Faried, Foye & Fournier (16)
| Kenneth Faried (10)
| Foye & Fournier (4)
| Moda Center20,068
| 25–33
|- style="background:#fcc;"
| 59
| March 3
| Minnesota
| 
| Ty Lawson (31)
| Wilson Chandler (10)
| Ty Lawson (11)
| Pepsi Center15,240
| 25–34
|- style="background:#cfc;"
| 60
| March 5
| Dallas
| 
| Wilson Chandler (21)
| Timofey Mozgov (10)
| Ty Lawson (7)
| Pepsi Center14,541
| 26–34
|- style="background:#cfc;"
| 61
| March 7
| L.A. Lakers
| 
| Kenneth Faried (32)
| Kenneth Faried (13)
| Ty Lawson (17)
| Pepsi Center18,248
| 27–34
|- style="background:#fcc;"
| 62
| March 9
| @ New Orleans
| 
| Kenneth Faried (22)
| Kenneth Faried (14)
| Ty Lawson (12)
| Smoothie King Center17,115
| 27–35
|- style="background:#fcc;"
| 63
| March 10
| @ Charlotte
| 
| Ty Lawson (24)
| Kenneth Faried (9)
| Ty Lawson (6)
| Time Warner Cable Arena14,312
| 27–36
|- style="background:#cfc;"
| 64
| March 12
| @ Orlando
| 
| Kenneth Faried (26)
| Wilson Chandler (10)
| Ty Lawson (12)
| Amway Center16,097
| 28–36
|- style="background:#cfc;"
| 65
| March 14
| @ Miami
| 
| Kenneth Faried (24)
| Kenneth Faried (10)
| Ty Lawson (9)
| American Airlines Arena19,600
| 29–36
|- style="background:#fcc;"
| 66
| March 15
| @ Atlanta
| 
| Kenneth Faried (25)
| J.J. Hickson (10)
| Ty Lawson (11)
| Philips Arena16,921
| 29–37
|- style="background:#cfc;"
| 67
| March 17
| L.A. Clippers
| 
| J.J. Hickson (21)
| Kenneth Faried (16)
| Brooks, Foye & Lawson (5)
| Pepsi Center16,553
| 30–37
|- style="background:#cfc;"
| 68
| March 19
| Detroit
| 
| Aaron Brooks (21)
| J.J. Hickson (11)
| Aaron Brooks (17)
| Pepsi Center16,671
| 31–37
|- style="background:#fcc;"
| 69
| March 21
| @ Dallas
| 
| J.J. Hickson (18)
| J.J. Hickson (8)
| Ty Lawson (9)
| American Airlines Center20,188
| 31–38
|- style="background:#cfc;"
| 70
| March 23
| Washington
| 
| Kenneth Faried (20)
| Kenneth Faried (8)
| Ty Lawson (8)
| Pepsi Center18,324
| 32–38
|- style="background:#fcc;"
| 71
| March 24
| @ Oklahoma City
| 
| Ty Lawson (25)
| Kenneth Faried (11)
| Ty Lawson (7)
| Chesapeake Energy Arena18,203
| 32–39
|- style="background:#fcc;"
| 72
| March 26
| @ San Antonio
| 
| Aaron Brooks (25)
| Timofey Mozgov (11)
| Aaron Brooks (8)
| AT&T Center17,949
| 32–40
|- style="background:#fcc;"
| 73
| March 28
| San Antonio
| 
| Randy Foye (20)
| Kenneth Faried (13)
| Ty Lawson (5)
| Pepsi Center19,155
| 32-41
|- style="background:#fcc;"
| 74
| March 31
| Memphis
| 
| Timofey Mozgov (23)
| Timofey Mozgov (10)
| Brooks & Lawson (6)
| Pepsi Center14,570
| 32-42

|- style="background:#cfc;"
| 75
| April 2
| New Orleans
| 
| Kenneth Faried (34)
| Kenneth Faried (13)
| Ty Lawson (12)
| Pepsi Center14,783
| 33-42
|- style="background:#fcc;"
| 76
| April 4
| @ Memphis
| 
| Randy Foye (21)
| Kenneth Faried (12)
| Randy Foye (4)
| FedExForum17,011
| 33-43
|- style="background:#fcc;"
| 77
| April 6
| @ Houston
| 
| Evan Fournier (26)
| Kenneth Faried (13)
| Aaron Brooks (15)
| Toyota Center18,325
| 33-44
|- style="background:#cfc;"
| 78
| April 9
| Houston
| 
| Randy Foye (30)
| Kenneth Faried (9)
| Randy Foye (15)
| Pepsi Center15,322
| 34-44
|- style="background:#cfc;"
| 79
| April 10
| @ Golden State
| 
| Timofey Mozgov (93)
| Timofey Mozgov (29)
| Brooks & Foye (7)
| Oracle Arena19,596
| 35-44
|- style="background:#cfc;"
| 80
| April 12
| Utah
| 
| Randy Foye (26)
| Kenneth Faried (21)
| Randy Foye (6)
| Pepsi Center18,832
| 36-44
|- style="background:#fcc;"
| 81
| April 15
| @ L.A. Clippers
| 
| Kenneth Faried (21)
| Timofey Mozgov (11)
| Randy Foye (7)
| Staples Center19,330
| 36-45
|- style="background:#fcc;"
| 82
| April 16
| Golden State
| 
| Randy Foye (32)
| Kenneth Faried (13)
| Randy Foye (11)
| Pepsi Center17,232
| 36-46

Player statistics

Regular season

|- align="center" bgcolor=""
| 
| 68 || 1 || 17.1 || .395 || .375 || .850 || 3.1 || .9 || .57 || .69 || 5.9
|- align="center" bgcolor=""
| 
| 29 || 12 || 29.0 || .406 || .362 || .900 || 2.7 || 5.2 || .93 || .24 || 11.9
|- align="center" bgcolor=""
| 
| 62 || 55 || 31.1 || .416 || .348 || .720 || 4.7 || 1.8 || .74 || .50 || 13.6
|- align="center" bgcolor=""
| 
| 80 || 77 || 27.2 || style=|.545 || .000 || .650 || 8.6 || 1.2 || .88 || .86 || 13.7
|- align="center" bgcolor=""
| 
| 76 || 4 || 19.8 || .419 || .376 || .760 || 2.7 || 1.5 || .45 || .09 || 8.4
|- align="center" bgcolor=""
| 
| 81 || style=|78 || 30.7 || .413 || .380 || .850 || 2.9 || 3.5 || .83 || .48 || 13.2
|- align="center" bgcolor=""
| 
| 39 || 11 || 17.2 || .390 || .349 || .740 || 3.4 || .9 || .79 || .33 || 6.8
|- align="center" bgcolor=""
| 
| 69 || 52 || 26.9 || .508 || .000 || .520 || style=|9.2 || 1.4 || .68 || .74 || 11.8
|- align="center" bgcolor=""
| 
| 62 || 61 || style=|35.8 || .431 || .356 || .800 || 3.5 ||style=|8.8 || style=|1.61 || .16 ||style=|17.6
|- align="center" bgcolor=""
| 
| 5 || 5 || 16.0 || .447 || .000 || style=|1.000 || 3.4 || .4 || .20 ||style=|1.40 || 7.0
|- align="center" bgcolor=""
| 
| 30 || 2 || 19.0 || .458 || style=|.500 || .740 || 2.4 || 3.3 || .50 || .23 || 5.9
|- align="center" bgcolor=""
| 
| 52 || 16 || 15.2 || .367 || .319 || .710 || 2.8 || .5 || .42 || .62 || 4.9
|- align="center" bgcolor=""
| 
| style=|82 || 30 || 21.6 || .523 || .167 || .750 || 6.4 || .8 || .33 || 1.22 || 9.4
|- align="center" bgcolor=""
| 
| 43 || 5 || 12.3 || .386 || .295 || .750 || 2.8 || .7 || .60 || .44 || 4.8
|- align="center" bgcolor=""
| 
| 44 || 1 || 19.7 || .428 || .377 || .840 || 1.8 || 2.5 || .82 || .09 || 10.4
|- align="center" bgcolor=""
| 
| 21 || 0 || 14.6 || .506 || .000 || .420 || 3.7 || .5 || 1.29 || .76 || 4.4
|}

 Statistics with the Denver Nuggets.

Transactions

Trades

Free agents

Additions

Subtractions

References

Denver Nuggets seasons
Denver Nuggets
Denver Nuggets
2013–14 NBA season by team